CNN Daybreak is an American early morning newscast aired on CNN, anchored from New York by Carol Costello. It debuted on June 1, 1980, the same day CNN went live.

First program
The first program to air live weekdays on the network, it preceded American Morning at 5:00 a.m. ET. Similar to First Look on MSNBC, the program was based on covering the news stories of the morning without talk and analysis, usually with correspondents on location or taped stories from the previous evening.

Until 2005
Until spring 2005, Daybreak was aired from the CNN Center in Atlanta. Costello then moved to New York following her marriage. The show moved to the Time Warner Center shortly after.

In October 2005, as a cost-cutting measure, the program was canceled. The last official broadcast was on November 25, 2005. Carol Costello graciously bid her crew farewell, thanking them, and telling viewers how much they will be missed. Carol currently is an anchor on HLN, based in Los Angeles.

After cancellation
The timeslot was occupied by a rerun of Anderson Cooper 360, with the 6am hour being replaced by American Morning which expanded. The Anderson Cooper 360 rerun was usually replaced with an early live edition of American Morning if there is breaking news. It was then replaced by American Morning Wake-Up Call until the cancellation of American Morning. Both hours are now occupied by Early Start.

In the early 1990s, CNN Daybreak ran as a 3-hour show with two different pairs of anchors. Whilst Rick Moore and Molly McCoy presented the 6am and 8am hours, Bob Cain in Atlanta and Norma Quarles in New York hosted the 7am hour.

References

External links
 Official Webpage on CNN.com
 Carol Costello Fan Club
 CNN Discontinues Daybreak, TV Newser

Daybreak
1980s American television news shows
1990s American television news shows
2000s American television news shows
1980 American television series debuts
2005 American television series endings